The 1924–25 Clarkson Golden Knights men's ice hockey season was the 5th season of play for the program. The team was coached by Gordon Croskery in his 2nd season.

Season
There was a good deal of anticipation for the team entering the year, with ice hockey swiftly becoming popular on campus. Unfortunately for Tech, the results on ice could hardly have been worse. The first game against Syracuse happened after only a week of practice, so when the team flagged towards the end of the match there wasn't much concern. The second game against Massena, with Clarkson now playing at home, saw the team pitted against a squad made up mostly of Canadians. Even with a loss, scoring 5 goals showed that the team was at least playing better.

The weather became a factor in the third match. Snowy conditions made it almost impossible to move the puck along the ice so there was little that could be taken from their 2–5 loss. Even with all the excuses, Tech was 0–3 going into a big test in the Capital District. Neither Union nor Rensselaer were expected to be very good. RPI in particular had posted a losing record every year since 1907, and were embarrassed more often than not when playing other college teams. Clarkson arrived in Schenectady looking for their first win and instead they got flattened. Union took the first game 1–5 but it was the drubbing by Rensselaer that was surprising. The Cherry and White used their smaller rink to their advantage and walloped the Golden Knights 1–14. 

The team had two weeks off before their final match, travelling downstate to play Hamilton, but the result was predictable. Because of weather conditions, the two ended up playing 4 periods rather than the standard three, but that hardly mattered for the final score. The Continentals were one of the best teams in the country and they proved as much with a 0–9 win, though Clarkson did perform better than they had in January.

Smith led the team in scoring with 4 goals.

Roster

Standings

Schedule and Results

|-
!colspan=12 style=";" | Regular Season

References

Clarkson Golden Knights men's ice hockey seasons
Clarkson
Clarkson
Clarkson
Clarkson